Azra "Akilah" Kohen (born 1979) is a Turkish record-breaking author and psychologist. After releasing her first novel, Fi, under the name Akilah, she started to release her subsequent novels, Çi and Pi under the name Azra Kohen. She later published best-selling novels Aeden in 2017 and Gör Beni in 2019. All of her books are still bestsellers (2022) in Turkey and she is the first Turkish novelist to reach the top 6 in the Italian bestselling list with her first 3 books called trilogy of Phi.

Early life and career
Azra Kohen was born as "Azra Sarızeybek" in 1979 in İzmir. She graduated from the Faculty of Communication, Radio, Television and Cinema, at Istanbul University. Azra Kohen later studied Economics at Ottawa University in Canada. She has her undergraduate Honours degree in Psychology by completing a psychology conversion degree and earned her master's degree in Psychology from the University of Liverpool by graduating with high honors as shown in her diploma. She said that her main motivation for educating herself was to "learn more about this world". She speaks English and Italian.

Her trilogy narrative series Fi, Çi and Pi soon became popular in the form of an Internet series called Fi. Azra Kohen also announced that she would write a book about what happened to her during the production process of Fi. Kohen's upcoming books will be Nakar and Dinle Beni.

Personal life 
She married Sadok Kohen in 2001 and the couple's son was born in 2009. She has not expressed any political opinions throughout her career. Kohen explained in an interview that she was not a vegetarian, but she was trying to be one.

Awards 
 Elele Avon Author of the Year Award (2018)
 Işık Association The Best Author of the Year (2019)
 Hacettepe University The Best Author of the Year (2020)

Works 
 Fi
 Çi
 Pi
 Aeden
 Gör Beni

References

External links 
Official website
Interview with Ayşe Arman

21st-century Turkish writers
1979 births
Psychological fiction writers
Living people
People from İzmir
Istanbul University alumni
Alumni of the University of Liverpool